Sam Yahel (born 1971) is a jazz pianist and Hammond organist. In 1990 he moved to New York City and worked with Bill Frisell, Wycliffe Gordon, Ryan Kisor, Maceo Parker, Madeleine Peyroux, and Joshua Redman.

Discography

As leader/co-leader 
 Searchin' (Naxos, 1997)
 In the Blink of an Eye (Naxos, 1999)
 Trio (Criss Cross, 1999)
 Truth and Beauty (Origin, 2007)
 Jazz Side of the Moon with Ari Hoenig, Mike Moreno, Seamus Blake (Chesky, 2008) – rec. 2007
 Hometown (Posi-Tone, 2009) – rec. 2007
 From Sun to Sun (Origin, 2011)

As a member 
Yaya3
with Joshua Redman and Brian Blade
 Yaya3 (Loma, 2002)

As sideman 

With Ralph Bowen
 Soul Proprietor (Criss Cross, 2001)
 Five (Criss Cross, 2008) – rec. 2007

With Norah Jones
 Come Away with Me (Blue Note, 2002) – rec. 2000–01

 Feels Like Home (Blue Note, 2004) – rec. 2003–04
 Covers (Blue Note, 2012) - compilation

With Ryan Kisor
 1997: Battle Cry (Criss Cross, 1998)
 2002: Awakening (Criss Cross, 2003)
 2002: The Sidewinder (Videoarts, 2003)
 2003: Donna Lee (Videoarts, 2004)

With Joshua Redman
 Elastic (Warner Bros., 2002)
 Momentum (Nonesuch, 2005)

With Jesse van Ruller
 Circles (Criss Cross, 2003)
 Views (Criss Cross, 2006)

With others
 Laila Biali, Laila Biali (ACT, 2018) – rec. 2016
  Massimo Biocati, Incontre (Bandcamp, 2020)
 Peter Cincotti, On the Moon (Concord, 2004)
 Larry Coryell, Impressions (Chesky, 2008)
 Charles Davis, Plays the Music of Bent Jaeding (Fresh Sound, 2008)
 Tia Fuller, Diamond Cut (Mack Avenue, 2018)
 Wycliffe Gordon, Dig This! (Criss Cross, 2002)
 Jesper Løvdal, Free Fall (ILK Music, 2008)
 Önder Focan, Beneath The Stars: Yıldızların Altında (Blue Note, 1998)
 Brad Mehldau, Ma Femme Est Une Actrice (Warner, 2001)
 Nicholas Payton, Mysterious Shorter (Chesky, 2006)
 Ben Perowsky, Bop On Pop (JazzKey Music, 2003)
 Madeleine Peyroux, Half the Perfect World (Rounder, 2006)
 Jim Rotondi, New Vistas (Criss Cross, 2004)
 Libor Šmoldas, In New York On Time (Animal Music, 2010)
 Torben Waldorff, Afterburn (Artistshare, 2008)
 Lizz Wright, Salt (Verve, 2003) – rec. 2002

References

American jazz organists
American male organists
Musicians from New York (state)
1971 births
Living people
Chesky Records artists
Naxos Records artists
Criss Cross Jazz artists
Posi-Tone Records artists
21st-century organists
21st-century American male musicians
American male jazz musicians
21st-century American keyboardists